<blockquote>Mangal Rajgan

Mangal Rajgan (also called: Mengal Tribe) is a small Town and Ward Number-9 of Tehsil Kallar Syedan District Rawalpindi in Punjab, Pakistan. 
On 1 July 2004, Mangal Rajgan became the Union Council of Tehsil Kallar Syedan. Rawalpindi District. Its population is estimated at 100,000-200,000, the vast majority of whom are Muslims who speak Pothwari and/or Punjabi.

The local economy is based on business community. Other families citizens have emigrated and support their families through foreign income. Most residents use public transportation- buses, rickshaws, and vans- as their primary means of modality.

External links
https://lgcd.punjab.gov.pk/system/files/demarcation%20notifications%20combined%20(1).pdf
</noinclude>

Union councils of Kallar Syedan Tehsil
Populated places in Kallar Syedan Tehsil
Towns in Kallar Syedan Tehsil
</Mangal Rajgan>